Wortham Ling is a  biological Site of Special Scientific Interest north of Wortham in Suffolk.

This site has acid grassland and dry heath on a sandy soil. Some areas are intensely grazed by rabbits, producing a very short sward which is a suitable habitat for lichens and mosses. Butterflies include many graylings.

There is access to the site from several roads and footpaths.

References

Sites of Special Scientific Interest in Suffolk